Kollage is a Hindi Rock/Pop Band from Kolkata, India, which has performed all over India and has helped popularize different genres of music likes soul, blues, jazz in Hindi music through their original work. They are most popular for their live acts in the corporate and club circuit and have created a niche for themselves as the "Rockers from the IT industry". They have the distinction of being a very rare instance (probably the first) of a Hindi band from the Software Industry (TCS) in India to have cut an original album.

History

Kollage is a Hindi Rock/Pop/Blues band formed by musicians who are also associates of TATA Consultancy Services (TCS), Kolkata. The band started back in 2003 and was brought together by Biswabijoy Sen and Koushik Chakraborty.Jishnu Dasgupta, Anirban Gomes and Prosenjit Bhattacharyya completed the initial line-up of the band. Back then, Kollage mostly played covers; ones that were closer to the Indipop genre. Their IT background, especially, was a novelty and during 2003, they played quite a few gigs in Kolkata.

The Second Coming

Back from an overseas assignment in early 2005, Biswabijoy Sen along with a new group of musicians - all of them once again from TCS - regrouped and "Kollage" was back; albeit as Rock/Blues inspired outfit. The new lineup included Shonit Bagchi, Parantap "Taps" Basu, Amritava "Amri" Biswas, Shuddha Satya Dey Mallick and Saikat Chatterjee. The big break came when they participated and won the TCS organized band contest named "RockMetazz" in Mumbai. And one more unexpected reward was waiting. An album which TCS Maitree wanted to produce. "June", their first album, released on 16 October 2006.

Present

Kollage has gone through a lineup changes. Biswabijoy (Singer/Songwriter/Rhythm Guitars) and Shonit (Bass Guitar) continue to perform the originals as well as covers in both Hindi and Bengali with various artistes.

Discography

June (Released October, 2006)

References

 
 

Indian rock music groups
Musical groups established in 2006